New Zealand political leader Keith Holyoake assembled a "shadow cabinet" within the National Party caucus after his change to the position of Leader of the Opposition in 1957. He composed this of individuals who acted for the party as spokespeople in assigned roles while he was Leader of the Opposition (1957–60). As the National Party formed the largest party not in government at the time, the frontbench team was as a result the Official Opposition within the New Zealand House of Representatives.

Frontbench team
The list below contains a list of Holyoake's shadow ministers and their respective roles.

Notes

References

New Zealand National Party
Holyoake, Keith
1957 establishments in New Zealand
1960 disestablishments in New Zealand